Edmund J. Bourne is an American self-help author  and researcher on anxiety, anxiety disorders and the treatment of anxiety disorders. He was the director of The Anxiety and Treatment Center in San Jose and Santa Rosa, California. In 1990, Edmund Bourne published The Anxiety and Phobia Workbook, a self-help book that won the Benjamin Franklin Book Award for Excellence in Psychology. This book is now in its 7th Edition.

He lives  in Florida.

Personal life
Bourne lives in Boca Raton, Florida with his wife, Tatyanna Peterson.  He was born in Akron, Ohio, completing a B.A. in philosophy at Colgate University and a Ph.D. in Behavioral Sciences at The University of Chicago.  He also completed a postdoctoral fellowship at the former Michael Reese Medical Center in Chicago.

He is author of several published journal articles and chapter titles, as well as the author of seven books, including the bestselling Anxiety & Phobia Workbook.  The Anxiety & Phobia Workbook presents a very eclectic, multifaceted approach toward overcoming anxiety disorders. It has sold well over a million copies and been translated into more than a dozen languages.

Published works
 Global Shift: How a New Worldview Is Transforming Humanity (2008)
 Natural Relief for Anxiety (2004)
 Beyond Anxiety and Phobia (2001)
 Coping with Anxiety, 2nd Edition (2016)
 The Anxiety and Phobia Workbook, 7th Edition (2020)
 Healing Fear: New Approaches to Overcoming Anxiety (1998)
 Overcoming Specific Phobia (1998)

References

External links

}

21st-century American psychologists
Living people
Year of birth missing (living people)